John Coyle White (November 26, 1924 – January 21, 1995) was an American Democratic politician from Texas. He was the longest-serving Texas Commissioner of Agriculture, first elected in 1950 and serving until his resignation in 1977. He was the youngest person ever elected to statewide office in Texas. From 1977 to 1978, he was United States Deputy Secretary of Agriculture. From 1978 to 1981, he was the chairman of the Democratic National Committee under U.S. President Jimmy Carter.

Early years

White was born in Newport in Clay County in north Texas. His father, Ed White, was a sharecropper. White graduated in 1946 from Texas Technological College in Lubbock.

Texas agriculture commissioner
At the age of twenty-five, White was elected statewide as the Agriculture Commissioner, the youngest person ever elected to statewide office in Texas. He was re-elected twelve times and served 26.5 years in the post. He worked to smooth the transition of Texas from an agricultural to a predominantly urban economy.  White established marketing programs that served as models for other state governments. He was responsible for establishing a close working relationship with Mexican agricultural entities that had expanded markets for both countries.

Deputy Secretary of Agriculture
In 1977, U.S. President Jimmy Carter nominated White to serve as Deputy Secretary of the U.S. Department of Agriculture.  He was responsible for the implementation of national agriculture policy and was the chief U.S. representative in negotiations with foreign governments, including the Soviet Union, on grain agreements. White served during a period of great unrest among the nation's farmers. His calm and reasoned arbitration with disaffected groups resulted in several successful changes in U.S. farm policy.  White resigned his post in 1978, when President Carter tapped him to lead the Democratic National Committee.

Chairman of the Democratic National Committee
He helped the Democratic Party retain its majority in the 1978 congressional elections. The Republicans took control of the presidency and the U.S. Senate in the 1980 elections, but the Democrats retained their majority in the United States House of Representatives under the leadership of Tip O'Neill. John White was DNC chairman at a time when Democrats controlled the White House, the Senate, the House of Representatives, and a majority of governorships.

Death and burial

White died on January 20, 1995, in Washington, D.C. He is interred at the Texas State Cemetery in Austin, Texas.

References

American political consultants
Democratic National Committee chairs
1924 births
1995 deaths
Agriculture commissioners of Texas
Texas Democrats
Texas Tech University alumni
People from Clay County, Texas
People from Austin, Texas
United States Deputy Secretaries of Agriculture
Carter administration personnel
20th-century American politicians